Cyclobarbital, also known as cyclobarbitol or cyclobarbitone, is a barbiturate derivative. It was available in Russia as a fixed-dose combination with diazepam (100 mg cyclobarbital + 10 mg diazepam; brand name Reladorm) for the treatment of insomnia but was discontinued in 2019.

References 

Barbiturates
GABAA receptor positive allosteric modulators
Cyclohexenes